Lycée Vincent van Gogh La Haye-Amsterdam is a French international school in the Netherlands. It has one campus in The Hague and two campuses in Amsterdam. The campus in The Hague serves primary school through lycée (senior high school). The Amsterdam campus only has a primary school.

Every year in spring, the school organises a Model United Nations called Modèle Francophone des Nations Unies (MFNU)

References

External links

  Lycée Vincent van Gogh La Haye-Amsterdam

International schools in Amsterdam
International schools in the Netherlands
French international schools in Europe
Schools in The Hague